"Boy Wanted" is a 1921 song composed by George Gershwin, with lyrics by Ira Gershwin. It was introduced in the musical A Dangerous Maid (1921). Philip Furia in his 1997 book Ira Gershwin: The Art of the Lyricist describes "Boy Wanted" as featuring "by far the most ambitious lyric" in A Dangerous Maid and likens the song to a 'catalog gue song' reminiscent of the work of Gilbert and Sullivan.

The lyrics recount the efforts of four girls describing the ideal qualities of a future partner; in the style of a newspaper advertisement.

The song was reused by the Gershwins for the 1924 British musical Primrose. Ira had heavily revised the lyric in the three years since he had written it, Furia felt this reflected his evolution from an "apprentice to a journeyman lyricist".

Musicologist David Schiff in his 1997 book Gershwin: Rhapsody in Blue, wrote that the essence of "Boy Wanted" was its "simplicity". Schiff felt the song was less obviously syncopated than the Gershwins previous efforts yet still "keeps the voice off the downbeat".

Notable recordings 
Ella Fitzgerald - Ella Fitzgerald Sings the George and Ira Gershwin Songbook (1959) (first recording)

References

Songs with music by George Gershwin
Songs with lyrics by Ira Gershwin
1921 songs
Songs from George and Ira Gershwin musicals